David Jefferson may refer to:

David Jefferson, wrestler in The Mod Squad
David Gregory Jefferson, civil servant

See also

Jefferson (surname)